Love Monster is an EP released by American rock band Monster Magnet, although all songs on the album were recorded by lead singer Dave Wyndorf in 1988, a year before the band was formed. Only 3,000 copies of Love Monster were released, making it Monster Magnet's rarest material.

Track listing
All tracks written by Dave Wyndorf except where cited.
 "Love Monster"
 "War Hippie"
 "Poster"
 "Atom Age Vampire"
 "Brighter Than the Sun"
 "I'm Five Years Ahead of My Time" (The Third Bardo cover)
 "Snoopy"

References

 http://forum.funkysouls.com/dump/f33t8382n20.html
 http://www.aural-innovations.com/issues/issue17/monmag04.html

External links
 Official band website

2001 EPs
Monster Magnet albums